Slunjčica is a village in Croatia, under the Slunj township, in Karlovac County. It is located at the source of the Slunjčica river.

References

Geography of Croatia
Populated places in Karlovac County